A constitutional referendum was held in the Bahamas on 7 June 2016. Voters were asked whether they approve of four separate constitutional amendments. All four proposals were rejected.

Proposed amendments

Articles 8 and 9
Article 8 would have been amended from:
"A person born outside The Bahamas after  shall become a citizen of The Bahamas at the date of his birth if at that date his father is a citizen of The Bahamas otherwise than by virtue of this Article or Article 3(2) of this Constitution."
to:
" A person born outside The Bahamas after  shall become a citizen of The Bahamas at the date of his birth if at that date his father  is a citizen of The Bahamas otherwise than by virtue of this Article or Article 3(2)  of this Constitution.
"

Article 9 would have been deleted. It states:
"Further provisions for persons born outside The Bahamas after 9th July 1973.
9.- (1) Notwithstanding anything contained in Article 8 of this Constitution, a person born legitimately outside The Bahamas after 9th July 1973 whose mother is a citizen of The Bahamas shall be entitled, upon making application on his attaining the age of eighteen years and before he attains the age of twenty-one years, in such manner as may be prescribed, to be registered as a citizen of The Bahamas:
Provided that if he is a citizen of some country other than The Bahamas he shall not be entitled to be registered as a citizen of The Bahamas under this Article unless he renounces his citizenship of that other country, takes the oath of allegiance and makes and registers such declaration of his intentions concerning residence as may be prescribed.
(2) Where a person cannot renounce his citizenship of some other country under the law of that country, he may instead make such declaration concerning that citizenship as may be prescribed.
(3) Any application for registration under this Article shall be subject to such exceptions or qualifications as may be prescribed in the interests of national security or public policy."

Article 10
Article 10 would have been amended from:
"10. -  marries a person who is or becomes a citizen of The Bahamas shall be entitled, provided she is still so married, upon making application in such manner as may be prescribed and upon taking the oath of allegiance of such declaration as may be prescribed, to be registered as a citizen of The Bahamas:
Provided that the right to be registered as a citizen of The Bahamas under this Article shall be subject to such exceptions or qualifications as may be prescribed in the interests of national security of public policy."
to:
"10. -  marries a person who is or becomes a citizen of The Bahamas shall be entitled, provided she is still so married, upon making application in such manner as may be prescribed and upon taking the oath of allegiance of such declaration as may be prescribed, to be registered as a citizen of The Bahamas:
Provided that the right to be registered as a citizen of The Bahamas under this Article shall be subject to such exceptions or qualifications as may be prescribed in the interests of national security of public policy 

"

Article 14
Sections 1 and 3 of article 14 would have been amended from:
"14.- (1) 
to:
"14.- (1) 

Article 26
Sections 3 and 4 of article 26 would have been amended from:
2"6. - (3) In this Article, the expression "discriminatory" means affording different treatment to different person attributable wholly or mainly to their respective descriptions by race, place of origin, political opinions, colour  whereby person of one such description are subjected to disabilities or restrictions to which person of another such description are not made subject or are accorded privileges or advantages which are not accorded to persons of another such description.
(5) Nothing contained in any law shall be held to be inconsistent with or in contravention of paragraph (1) of this Article to the extent that it makes provision with respect to standards or qualifications (not being a standard or qualification specifically relating to race, place of origin, political opinions, colour  in order to be eligible for service as a public officer or as a member of a disciplined force of for the service of a local government authority or a body corporate established by law for public purposes."
to:
"26. - (3) In this Article, the expression "discriminatory" means affording different treatment to different person attributable wholly or mainly to their respective descriptions by race, place of origin, political opinions, colour whereby person of one such description are subjected to disabilities or restrictions to which person of another such description are not made subject or are accorded privileges or advantages which are not accorded to persons of another such description.
(5) Nothing contained in any law shall be held to be inconsistent with or in contravention of paragraph (1) of this Article to the extent that it makes provision with respect to standards or qualifications (not being a standard or qualification specifically relating to race, place of origin, political opinions, colour in order to be eligible for service as a public officer or as a member of a disciplined force of for the service of a local government authority or a body corporate established by law for public purposes."

In addition, a new section 11 would have been added:
"

Results

References

2016
2016 referendums
2016 in the Bahamas
2016